The Liga Sudamericana de Básquetbol (LSB), or FIBA Liga Sudamericana de Básquetbol  (Portuguese: Liga Sul-Americana de Basquete, English: South American Basketball League), also commonly known as FIBA South American League, is the second-tier level South American professional basketball competition at the club level, with the first-tier level now considered the panamerican competition of the Champions League. The competition is organized by the South American Basketball Association (ABASU), which operates as a regional sub-zone of FIBA Americas. The winner of each year's competition gets a place at the upcoming edition of the Basketball Champions League Americas.

The league usually includes some national domestic champions, and some runners-up, from the best national leagues and basketball countries on the South American continent. Depending on the country, places may be awarded on the basis of performance in the previous season's national domestic league, or over the previous two or three national domestic seasons. The tournament has been played since 1996, with 2003 being the only year in which it was not held.

History 
The South American Championship of Champions Clubs, which was founded in 1946, was the first international club tournament played between basketball clubs from South America, and it was the first-tier and most important club competition in South America. In 1993, the Pan American Club Championship was launched including also Central American teams and was held annually until 2000.The FIBA South American League was founded in 1996 and became the top South American competition, with the historical South American Basketball Championship becoming now the second tier. The champions of the FIBA South American League would automatically earn a spot to the biennial World club competition of the McDonald's Championship which was supported by FIBA.  Atenas in 1997 and Vasco da Gama in 1999 were the only two teams that represented South America in the competition which also included NBA champions. Atenas also represented South America as champions in the 1996 FIBA Intercontinental Cup.

With the emergence of the new panamerican competition called the FIBA Americas League, in December 2007, the FIBA South American League became the second-tier international club championship in South America, beginning with the 2008 edition of the competition. The winner was also allocated a spot in the following year's FIBA Americas League.

On 24 September 2019, FIBA launched the competition, which derives its name and branding from the European Basketball Champions League. The competition replaced the FIBA Americas League as premier league in the Americas. The competition will consist of twelve teams, which have to qualify through their domestic leagues. The inaugural season is expected to start in October 2019.

The 2020 and 2021 seasons were cancelled because of the effects of the COVID-19 pandemic. In 2022, the league returned.

FIBA South American League levels on the South American pyramid

 1st-tier: (2001 – 2007)
 2nd-tier: (1996 – 2000, 2008 – Present)

Names of the top-tier level South American / Latin American competition
 CONSUBASQUET era: (1946–2007)
 Campeonato Sudamericano de Clubes Campeones de Básquetbol (English: South American Basketball Championship of Champions Clubs): (1946–1992)
 Campeonato Panamericano de Clubes de Básquetbol (English: Pan American Basketball Club Championship): (1993–2000)
 Liga Sudamericana de Básquetbol (LSB) (English: South American Basketball League): (2001–2007)
 FIBA Americas era: (2007–present)
 FIBA Americas League: (2007 – 2019)
 Basketball Champions League Americas: (2019 – present)

Title holders 

 1996  Olimpia
 1997  Atenas
 1998  Atenas
 1999  Vasco da Gama
 2000  Vasco da Gama
 2001  Estudiantes
 2002  Libertad
 2003 Not held
 2004  Atenas
 2005  Unitri Uberlândia
 2006  Ben Hur
 2007  Libertad
 2008  Regatas Corrientes
 2009  Flamengo (I)
 2009  Quimsa (II)
 2010  Brasília
 2011  Obras Sanitarias
 2012  Regatas Corrientes
 2013  Brasília
 2014  Bauru
 2015  Brasília
 2016  Mogi das Cruzes
 2017  Guaros de Lara
 2018  Franca
 2019  Botafogo

Grand Finals

Titles by club

Titles by country

Awards

See also 
 FIBA Americas League
 Basketball Champions League Americas
 Pan American Championship
 South American Championship of Champions Clubs

References

External links
 Liga Sudamericana Official Website 
 LatinBasket.com Liga Sudamericana

 
International club basketball competitions
Basketball leagues in South America
1996 establishments in South America